Masterpieces is a compilation by Australian rock group Little River Band, released on 14 October 2022. It comprises band and fan favourite songs not released as singles. All songs were remastered for this release. The album debuted at number 75 on the ARIA Charts.

Track listing 
CD1
 "My Lady and Me" – 5:16
 "Days On the Road" – 5:23
 "Broke Again" – 3:28
 "Seine City" – 3:47
 "Another Runway" – 6:32
 "Raelene, Raelene" – 4:32
 "Fall from Paradise" – 5:06
 "Light of Day" – 8:04
 "By My Side" – 4:28
 "Hard Life" (Prelude) – 2:46
 "Hard Life" – 4:50
 "Middle Man" – 4:29
 "Mistress of Mine" – 5:16
 
CD2
 "Just Say That You Love Me" – 4:02
 "Don't Let The Needle Win" – 3:39
 "Mr. Socialite" – 5:26
 "Sleepless Nights" – 5:17
 "Easy Money" – 4:01
 "I Know It" – 3:22
 "Love Letters" – 3:08
 "Blind Eyes" – 5:02
 "No Reins On Me" – 4:41
 "How Many Nights? " – 4:38
 "When the War Is Over" – 5:13
 "Face in the Crowd" – 4:48
 "Full Circle" – 1:58

Charts

Release history

References 

 

 
2022 greatest hits albums
Little River Band albums
Compilation albums by Australian artists
Universal Records compilation albums